Yungang District formerly, Nanjiao District is a district of the city of Datong, Shanxi province, China. In February 2018 all of Datong Mining District and parts of Datong Cheng District merged with Nanjiao District to form the new Yungang District. Simultaneously northern parts of Nanjiao District merged into Xinrong District.

References

Weblinks
www.xzqh.org 

County-level divisions of Shanxi
Datong